Viburnum luzonicum, the Luzon viburnum, is a species of flowering plant in the family Viburnaceae. It is native to southeast and south-central China, Taiwan, the Philippines, Vietnam, and the Maluku Islands. A dense, rounded evergreen bush reaching , and taking readily to pruning into hedges, it is hardy to USDA zone 7.

References

luzonicum
Flora of South-Central China
Flora of Southeast China
Flora of Taiwan
Flora of Vietnam
Flora of the Philippines
Flora of the Maluku Islands
Plants described in 1884